The Women's aerials competition at the FIS Freestyle Ski and Snowboarding World Championships 2021 was held on 10 March 2021.

Qualification
The qualification was started at 09:40. The twelve best skiers qualified for the final.

Final
The final was started at 15:00.

References

Women's aerials